Tora-san Riding High is a 1979 Japanese comedy film directed by Yoji Yamada. It stars Kiyoshi Atsumi as Torajirō Kuruma (Tora-san), and Kaori Momoi as his love interest or "Madonna". Tora-san, the Matchmaker is the twenty-third entry in the popular, long-running Otoko wa Tsurai yo series.

Synopsis
Tora-san convinces the hesitant Hitomi to go through with her plans to marry her intended spouse.

Cast
 Kiyoshi Atsumi as Torajiro
 Chieko Baisho as Sakura
 Kaori Momoi as Hitomi Irie
 Akira Fuse as Kunio Koyanagi
 Michiyo Kogure as Kuniko Irie
 Masami Shimojō as Kuruma Tatsuzō
 Chieko Misaki as Tsune Kuruma (Torajiro's aunt)
 Gin Maeda as Hiroshi Suwa
 Hayato Nakamura as Mitsuo Suwa
 Hisao Dazai as Boss (Umetarō Katsura)
 Hiroshi Inuzuka as Taxi driver
 Gajirō Satō as Genkō
 Chishū Ryū as Gozen-sama
 Tatsuo Matsumura as Reikichi Matsuda

Critical appraisal
Tora-san, the Matchmaker was the third top box-office film in Japan for the year of 1979. For his performances in Tora-san, the Matchmaker and the next entry in the series, Tora-san's Dream of Spring (also 1979), Kiyoshi Atsumi was nominated for Best Actor at the Japan Academy Prize ceremony. Chieko Baisho was nominated for Best Supporting Actress at the same ceremony for both films also.

Stuart Galbraith IV writes that one of the pleasures of Tora-san, the Matchmaker is in the performance of noted actress Michiyo Kogure in one of her last roles. The German-language site molodezhnaja gives Tora-san, the Matchmaker three out of five stars.

Availability
Tora-san, the Matchmaker was released theatrically on August 4, 1979. In Japan, the film was released on videotape in 1996, and in DVD format in 2000, 2005, and 2008.

References

Bibliography

English

German

Japanese

External links
 Tora-san, the Matchmaker at www.tora-san.jp (official site)

1979 films
Films directed by Yoji Yamada
1979 comedy films
1970s Japanese-language films
Otoko wa Tsurai yo films
Shochiku films
Films with screenplays by Yôji Yamada
Japanese sequel films
1970s Japanese films